IFK Viksjö is a Swedish football club located in Järfälla outside Stockholm in Sweden.

Background
IFK Viksjö currently plays in Division 3 Stockholm Norra which is the sixth tier of Swedish football. They play their home matches at the Viksjövallen in Järfälla.

The club is affiliated to Stockholms Fotbollförbund. IFK Viksjö played in the 2006 Svenska Cupen but lost 0–1 at home to Hammarby TFF in the first round.

Season to season

Footnotes

External links
 IFK Viksjö – Official website
 IFK Viksjö on Facebook

Football clubs in Stockholm
1983 establishments in Sweden
Idrottsföreningen Kamraterna